The Football Writers' Association Footballer of the Year (often called the FWA Footballer of the Year, or in England simply the Footballer of the Year) is an annual award given to the player who is adjudged to have been the best of the season in English football. The award has been presented since the 1947–48 season, with the inaugural winner being Blackpool winger Stanley Matthews. The latest winner of the award as of 2021–22 is Mohamed Salah of Liverpool. Nine players have won the award on more than one occasion, with Thierry Henry having won the award on the most occasions, with three wins in four seasons.

The winner is selected by a vote amongst the members of the Football Writers' Association (FWA), which comprises around 400 football journalists based throughout England. The award was instigated at the suggestion of Charles Buchan, a former professional footballer turned journalist and one of the Association's founders.

Winners
The award has been presented on 75 occasions as of 2022, to 66 players. On one occasion two players shared the award for a season. The table also indicates where the winning player also won one or more of the other major "player of the year" awards in English football, namely the Professional Footballers' Association's Players' Player of the Year award (PPY), Fans' Player of the Year award (FPY), the Young Player of the Year award (YPY), the Premier League Player of the Season award (PPS),, the Football Supporter Association Player of the Year (FSA), and the Football Supporters' Federation Player of the Year award (FSF).

Breakdown of winners

By country

‡ — two winners

Winners by club

See also
PFA Players' Player of the Year
SPFA Players' Player of the Year
SFWA Footballer of the Year
PFAI Players' Player of the Year
Premier League Player of the Season

References

External links
Football Writers' Association

English football trophies and awards
England 3
Awards established in 1948
1948 establishments in England
Annual events in England
Annual sporting events in the United Kingdom